Kajakaja of New Guinea may be:
Central Asmat language, a Papuan language of the southern coastal plains of Indonesian New Guinea
Nduga language, a Papuan language of the Indonesian New Guinea Highlands